Brusimpiano is a comune (municipality) on Lake Lugano in the Province of Varese in the Italian region Lombardy, located about  northwest of Milan and about  north of Varese, on the border with Switzerland.

Brusimpiano borders the following municipalities: Barbengo (Switzerland), Caslano (Switzerland), Cuasso al Monte, Lavena Ponte Tresa, Marzio, Morcote (Switzerland), Porto Ceresio. The Comune is not far away from the Cinque Vette Park.

References

Cities and towns in Lombardy
Populated places on Lake Lugano